Lolita Schneiders (March 3, 1931- November 12, 2022 (Age 91 years). was an American politician, teacher, and businesswoman who served as a member of the Wisconsin State Assembly.

Early life and education 
Born in Chicago, Illinois, Schneiders went to Lourdes High School and Mundelein College in Chicago. She then received her bachelor's degree in education from University of Wisconsin–Stevens Point.

Career 
Schneiders worked as a saleswomen, teacher, and insurance agent in Menomonee Falls, Wisconsin. She served in the Wisconsin State Assembly from 1981 until 1997 as a Republican. After leaving the Assembly, Schneiders served on the University of Wisconsin–Madison Board of Regents.

Personal life 
Schneiders and her husband had three children. In 2002, Schneiders' daughter was killed in a car accident near Cloverland, Vilas County, Wisconsin. Schneiders, who had been driving in the car with her husband and daughter, was injured. In 2017, Schneiders' husband, Don, died at the age of 86.

Notes

1931 births
Living people
Politicians from Chicago
People from Menomonee Falls, Wisconsin
Loyola University Chicago alumni
University of Wisconsin–Stevens Point alumni
Businesspeople from Wisconsin
Women state legislators in Wisconsin
21st-century American women
Republican Party members of the Wisconsin State Assembly